Lizzie Muthoka Wanyoike, (née Elizabeth Muthoka), is a Kenyan businesswoman, entrepreneur, educator and philanthropist, who is the founder and chief executive officer of the Nairobi Institute of Business Studies (NIBS).

Background and education
Lizzie Wanyoike was born in Murang'a County in the 1950s. She is the sixth-born in a family of ten siblings. Her father was a village chief while her mother was a peasant housewife. The family was of poor means, according to her own account.

She attended Gathuki-ini Primary School, in Wathenge, Muranga County, before transferring to Kahuhia Girls High School, in Karuri, Muranga County, where she graduated with a High School Diploma. She was then admitted to Kenyatta University College (today Kenyatta University), where she graduated with a Diploma in Education.

Work experience
In 1972, she was posted to State House Girls' School in Nairobi, as a secondary school teacher, at a monthly salary of KSh 961 (approx. US$140 at that time). By 1975, She realized that working for someone else was not her calling. With her husband and other business partners, they established Temple College of Secretarial Studies, based in Nairobi.

Wanyoike, who served as Principal and instructor at Temple, approached management with ideas about expanding the course menu, as well as increasing student intake, management rejected her proposals. In 1999, armed with savings of KSh6 million (US$60,000) and a bank loan from Equity Bank Kenya Limited, worth KSh4 million (US$40,000), she quit Temple and established NIBS.

Founding of NAIROBI Institute of Business Studies
With the KSh10 million she had raised Wanyoike established NIBS in rented premises, starting with 25 students and two teachers, in 2000.

By 2018, NIBS had a student population of over 6,000 and an instructor body numbering over 250, on four campuses at Ongata Rongai, Thika Town, Nairobi Central Business District and Ruiru-Kimbo, along Thika Highway.

NIBS Hotel Kileleshwa
The development will offer commercial services and also serve NIBS' hospitality students during practical training and internships. The hotel, budgeted to cost KSh400 million (US$4 million), is partly funded with loans from Equity Bank Kenya Limited.

Other investments
Wanyoike has other investments in real estate, and the stock market.

Lizzie Wanyoike Foundation
The foundation performs charity work, including the sponsorship of over 20 disadvantaged students at NIBS and more students in Kenyan high schools.

See also
 Margaret Ireri
 Jane Catherine Ngila
 Jennifer Riria

References

External links
Website of Nairobi Institute of Business Studies
Lizzie Wanyoike’s journey from teacher to education entrepreneur As of 18 September 2014.

Living people
Kikuyu people
Year of birth missing (living people)
Kenyan educators
20th-century Kenyan businesswomen
20th-century Kenyan businesspeople
21st-century Kenyan businesswomen
21st-century Kenyan businesspeople
Kenyan chief executives
Kenyan women business executives
Kenyatta University alumni
People from Murang'a County